Tathong Channel, also known as Nam Tong Hoi Hap (originally ), refers to the eastern sea waters in Hong Kong leading into Victoria Harbour through Lei Yue Mun, bounded by Junk Island (Fat Tong Chau) and Tung Lung Chau in the east, and Hong Kong Island in the west.

References 

Channels of Hong Kong
Sai Kung District
Eastern District, Hong Kong
Southern District, Hong Kong